M. M. Ramachandran (31 July 1942 – 2 October 2022), better known as Atlas Ramachandran, was an Indian jeweller, film producer and actor. He was the chairman of Atlas Jewellery and is known for the tagline of his jewellery, "Janakodikalude Vishwastha Sthapanam". He had produced and distributed films under the banner "Chandrakanth Films". Vaisali (1988) and Sukrutham (1994) are the major films that he has produced. He has also acted in few movies notabily in Subhadram (2007) in a lead role.

Early life
Mathukkara Moothedath Ramachandran was born in Mullassery on 31 July 1942 into a family with a rich cultural and literary background. His father, late V. Kamalakara Menon (d. 1995), was a poet and there were frequent Akshara Shlokam recitation sessions at his home. Ramachandran was the third of the eight children of his parents, and the second son. After acquiring his bachelor's degree in commerce from St.Thomas College, Thrissur affiliate to Kerala University, Ramachandran left to New Delhi for work.

Career
In Delhi, Ramachandran started his career in the banking industry. He joined Canara Bank and completed a post-graduate degree in economics from the Delhi School of Economics. Later on, selected as a probationary officer by the State Bank of India, he moved to the State Bank of Travancore where he was a field officer, accountant and manager. By the time he left the bank, he was the superintendent of over 100 branches.

In 1974, he moved to Kuwait City to work for the Commercial Bank of Kuwait.
He assumed the post of Administration Manager of the International Division.

Having been convinced of the immense demand for gold ornaments, he opened the first ATLAS showroom in Souk Al Watya in Kuwait.

Kuwait was looted during the Gulf War and Ramachandran experienced a total loss, so he started over in the United Arab Emirates. He introduced the concept of mega-offers in the regional gold trade. From gold bars to luxurious cars, shoppers won generous prizes. ATLAS served well over a million customers. This led to the coining of the now famous slogan, "ATLAS jewellery-Trusted by Millions", with Ramachandran himself serving as the brand ambassador and lending his face and voice for the advertisements.

Marketing strategies 
Ramachandran developed numerous marketing strategies hitherto unknown in the gold industry. He believed in joint promotions with well-known brands. Some of his innovative promotions were:

 ATLAS Golden Harvest with Malayala Manorama
 ATLAS Read & Win with Gulf News
 ATLAS Gold Rush with Radio 4 FM
 ALTAS Golden Olympics with Khaleej Times
 ATLAS Golden Take off & ATLAS Golden Holidays with Air India
ATLAS Coupon Promotion with Bank of India

Positions 
Ramachandran was elected to serve as the first Chairman of the Gold Promotion Committee of the Dubai Shopping Festival (DSF) and was instrumental in crafting the concept of a gold-based shopping incentive. In the inaugural year of the DSF, 43 kilos of gold were given away as prizes. He served in this position for three consecutive years. ATLAS supports the DSF.

Other note-worthy positions include:

 Secretary of Dubai Gold & Jewellery Group for its first six years
 Key founding member of the Abu Dhabi Gold & Jewellery Group
 Editor of the film magazine Chalachithram
 Vice President of Malayalam Film Producers Association

Philanthropy 
Both in his adopted home in the Gulf and in India, his community initiatives include welfare, education, film, literature and music. He gave scores of gold medals in the UAE schools. He also gave scholarships to deserving students of limited means in Kerala. In the same way, customers of Atlas Jewellery were handed over the ornaments selected by them even if they were short of money. He patronized many competitions including reciting the Quran held by the Islamic organizations in the Gulf.

Legal Troubles
In the United Arab Emirates (as in many Arabian Gulf countries), loans are secured with a signed cheque. On the due date if a cheque cannot be processed because the account holder has insufficient funds this can be escalated into a criminal matter and debtors jailed to recoup debt. This is contrary to most developed countries where these issues only result in civil cases. In the Middle East, many business owners quietly leave the country when they face liquidity issues. Ramachandran stayed in the country to resolve his business and legal troubles. However, he was detained by the Dubai Police in August 2015. He sought to have his charges suspended but did not receive bail and was then imprisoned three months later by the Dubai Court. While in prison, his hospitals were sold to repay some loans. However, most jewellery shops simply closed and became insolvent. After nearly three years, he was released in June 2018. There was a major amendment made to UAE Federal Law on 2 January 2022 that decriminalised bounced cheques.

Death
Ramachandran died in a hospital in Dubai on 2 October following cardiac arrest. He was 80.

Filmography
Ramachandran ventured into film production and distribution. He was known as Vaisali Ramachandran due to the fame of his debut film production Vaisali, an episode from Mahabharata, which was a classic in the Malayalam film industry. He resigned from the Commercial Bank to focus solely on the jewellery business and motion pictures. At the time of his resignation, he was one of the most highly respected and highly paid bank managers in Kuwait. With his new focus, he either produced or distributed the hit films Sukrutham, Dhanam, Kauravar, Chakoram, Vasthuhara, Innale and Venkalam. A number of his films were selected to Indian Panorama, were critically acclaimed, and won prestigious awards.

References

External links
 Atlas Jewellery
 Ramachandran chosen for business excellence award
 Ramachandran signs agreement with Yusuf Ali M.A.
 An Iftar with Atlas Ramachandran in solidarity 
 Ramachandran in Aswamedham Kairali TV
 AtlasGroup thinking big
 Interview "Arike en Keralam" on People TV
 Interview on Kaumudi TV
 valentines corner with Ramachandran -2  
 valentines corner with Ramachandran -3  
 valentines corner with Ramachandran -4  
 Presenting Kamalakara Menon Suvarna Mudra for Aksharaslokam

1942 births
2022 deaths
21st-century Indian male actors
Film directors from Thrissur
Film producers from Thrissur
Indian male film actors
Malayalam film producers
Male actors from Thrissur
Male actors in Malayalam cinema